Kalme is a village in Tõrva Parish, Valga County in Estonia.

References

Villages in Valga County